Khanora railway station was a railway station located in Pakistan.

History
Khanora railway station was built in 1904 during British India era. In December 2018, the railway station was demolished.

See also
 List of railway stations in Pakistan
 Pakistan Railways

References

Railway stations in Jhang District
Railway stations on Shorkot–Lalamusa Branch Line
1900s establishments in British India
2018 disestablishments in Pakistan